Ib Sigfred Jacquet (born 12 April 1956) is a former Danish football player.

Club career
Ib Jacquet played in the forward position and was known as an unpredictable and entertaining player. He played 210 games and scored 81 goals for Vejle Boldklub. In 1982, he was the topscorer of the Danish football championship. He had a spell with Belgian side Antwerp in the end of the 1970s. He finished his career on 22 May 1986 in a match against Esbjerg.

International career
He played two games for the Denmark U21 team.

Honours
Danish 1st Division: 1
 1984

References

External links
 Danish national team profile
 Vejle Boldklub profile

1956 births
Living people
Association football forwards
Danish men's footballers
Denmark under-21 international footballers
Vejle Boldklub players
Royal Antwerp F.C. players
Kolding IF players
Boldklubben 1909 players
Danish Superliga players
Belgian Pro League players
Danish expatriate men's footballers
Expatriate footballers in Belgium
Danish expatriate sportspeople in Belgium